Peru Rodríguez Larrañaga (born 3 April 2002) is a Spanish professional footballer who plays as a central defender for Real Sociedad C.

Club career
Born in Antzuola, Gipuzkoa, Basque Country, Rodríguez represented Real Sociedad and Bergara KE as a youth. He made his senior debut with the C-team on 26 January 2020, coming on as second-half substitute in a 1–0 away win over CD Vitoria.

Rodríguez scored his first senior goal on 14 February 2021, netting the C's fourth in a 5–0 home routing of Urgatzi KK. He first appeared with the reserves on 12 November, starting in a 1–0 away success over Sporting de Gijón in the Segunda División.

References

External links

2002 births
Living people
Sportspeople from Gipuzkoa
Spanish footballers
Footballers from the Basque Country (autonomous community)
Association football defenders
Segunda División players
Segunda Federación players
Tercera División players
Real Sociedad C footballers
Real Sociedad B footballers